The 2019–20 Belgian First Amateur Division was the fourth season of the third-tier football league in Belgium. Mid-March all matches were temporarily postponed due to the COVID-19 pandemic in Belgium, only to be canceled permanently two weeks later, with the standing as of March 12th counting as final. As a result, Deinze was crowned champions and promoted to the 2020–21 Belgian First Division B.

Team information

Team changes

In
 Tubize was relegated from the 2018–19 Belgian First Division B.
 Sint-Eloois-Winkel was promoted after winning the 2018–19 Belgian Second Amateur Division A.
 Patro Eisden Maasmechelen was promoted after winning the 2018–19 Belgian Second Amateur Division B.
 La Louvière Centre was promoted after winning the 2018–19 Belgian Second Amateur Division C.
 Visé was promoted after winning the Promotion play-offs.

Out
 Virton were promoted from the 2018–19 Belgian First Amateur Division as champions.
 Aalst, ASV Geel and Knokke finished in the relegation zone (14th through 16th) in the 2018–19 Belgian First Amateur Division and were therefore relegated to the 2019–20 Belgian Second Amateur Division.
 Oudenaarde lost the relegation play-offs and were thus also relegated.

Merger
 Châtelet merged with Royal Olympic Club de Charleroi-Marchienne to become R. Olympic Charleroi Châtelet Farciennes, known as Olympic Charleroi CF. Strictly speaking, the new club is a continuation of Royal Olympic Club de Charleroi-Marchienne rather than Châtelet, as the latter club has been dissolved.

Regular season

League table

Results

Number of teams by provinces

References

Belgian National Division 1
Bel
3
Belgium